SHKP may refer to:

National Employment Service (Albania), an Albanian government agency
Sun Hung Kai Properties, a property developer company in Hong Kong